This was the fifteenth season of the competition. The League Cup was again known as the John Player Special Trophy this season for sponsorship reasons.

Wigan won the final, beating Hull Kingston Rovers by the score of 11-8. The match was played at Elland Road, Leeds. The attendance was 17,573 and receipts were £66714.

Background 
This season saw several changes in the  entrants :-
1 Bridgend Blue Dragons and Southend Invicta both folded
2 and the invitation to two junior clubs continued
This involved a decrease in entrants to thirty-six, in turn resulting in a 4 match, 8 club preliminary round to reduce the number of clubs taking part in the first round proper to thirty-two
There were no drawn matches throughout the  tournament

Competition and results

Preliminary round 

Involved  4 matches and 8 Clubs

Round 1 - First  Round 

Involved  16 matches and 32 Clubs

Round 2 - Second  Round 

Involved  8 matches and 16 Clubs

Round 3 -Quarter Finals 

Involved 4 matches with 8 clubs

Round 4 – Semi-Finals 

Involved 2 matches and 4 Clubs

Final

Teams and scorers 

Scoring - Try = four points - Goal = two points - Drop goal = one point

Prize money 
As part of the sponsorship deal and funds, the  prize money awarded to the competing teams for this season is as follows :-

Note - the  author is unable to trace the award amounts for this season. Can anyone help ?

The road to success 
This tree excludes any preliminary round fixtures

Notes and comments 
1 * Jubilee Hotel are a Junior (amateur) club from Featherstone
2 * West Hull are a Junior (amateur) club from Hull
3 * highest score, highest score by away team, and highest winning margin - all between professional clubs, to date
4 * RUGBYLEAGUEproject and Huddersfield Heritage  give the  score as 20-10 but Wigan official archives gives it as 20-18
5 * Mansfield Marksman have moved from Mansfield and are now playing at North Street, Alfreston
6  * Elland Road,  Leeds,  is the home ground of Leeds United A.F.C. with a capacity of 37,914 (The record attendance was 57,892 set on 15 March 1967 for a cup match Leeds v Sunderland). The ground was originally established in 1897 by Holbeck RLFC who played there until their demise after the conclusion of the 1903-04 season

General information for those unfamiliar 
The council of the Rugby Football League voted to introduce a new competition, to be similar to The Football Association and Scottish Football Association's "League Cup". It was to be a similar knock-out structure to, and to be secondary to, the Challenge Cup. As this was being formulated, sports sponsorship was becoming more prevalent and as a result John Player and Sons, a division of Imperial Tobacco Company, became sponsors, and the competition never became widely known as the "League Cup" 
The competition ran from 1971-72 until 1995-96 and was initially intended for the professional clubs plus the two amateur BARLA National Cup finalists. In later seasons the entries were expanded to take in other amateur and French teams. The competition was dropped due to "fixture congestion" when Rugby League became a summer sport
The Rugby League season always (until the onset of "Summer Rugby" in 1996) ran from around August-time through to around May-time and this competition always took place early in the season, in the Autumn, with the final usually taking place in late January 
The competition was variably known, by its sponsorship name, as the Player's No.6 Trophy (1971–1977), the John Player Trophy (1977–1983), the John Player Special Trophy (1983–1989), and the Regal Trophy in 1989.

See also 
1985–86 Rugby Football League season
1985 Lancashire Cup
1985 Yorkshire Cup
John Player Special Trophy
Rugby league county cups

References

External links
Saints Heritage Society
1896–97 Northern Rugby Football Union season at wigan.rlfans.com 
Hull&Proud Fixtures & Results 1896/1897
Widnes Vikings - One team, one passion Season In Review - 1896-97
The Northern Union at warringtonwolves.org
Huddersfield R L Heritage
Wakefield until I die

1985 in English rugby league
1986 in English rugby league
League Cup (rugby league)